A list of films produced in Spain in 1973 (see 1973 in film).

1973

External links
 Spanish films of 1973 at the Internet Movie Database

1973
Spanish
Films